Elections to Liverpool Town Council were held on Monday 1 November 1871. One third of the council seats were up for election, the term of office of each councillor being three years.

Ten of the sixteen wards were uncontested.

After the election, the composition of the council was:

Election result

Because of the large number of uncontested seats, these statistics should be taken in that context.

Ward results

* - Retiring Councillor seeking re-election

Abercromby

Castle Street

Everton

Exchange

Great George

Lime Street

North Toxteth

Pitt Street

Rodney Street

St. Anne Street

St. Paul's

St. Peter's

Scotland

South Toxteth

Vauxhall

West Derby

Aldermanic Election

At the meeting of the Council on 9 November 1877, the terms of office of eight 
alderman expired.

The following eight were elected as Aldermen by the Council (Aldermen and Councillors) on 9 November 1871 for a term of six years.

* - re-elected aldermen.

By-elections

No. 15, South Toxteth, 30 December 1871

The death of Alderman Raymond William Houghton JP was reported to the Council on 20 December 1871.

Councillor Andrew Barclay Walker (Conservative, South Toxteth, elected 1 November 1870) was elected as an alderman by the Council (Aldermen and Councillors) on 20 December 1871.

No. 4, St. Paul's, 20 March 1872

The death of Alderman John Hayward Turner JP was reported to the Council on 6 March 1871.

William Barton (Conservative, St. Paul's, elected 1 November 1869) was elected as an Alderman by the Council (Councillors and Aldermen) on 11 March 1872.

See also

 Liverpool City Council
 Liverpool Town Council elections 1835 - 1879
 Liverpool City Council elections 1880–present
 Mayors and Lord Mayors of Liverpool 1207 to present
 History of local government in England

References

1871
1871 English local elections
1870s in Liverpool